The Rural Municipality of Willow Bunch No. 42 is a rural municipality (RM) in the Canadian province of Saskatchewan within Census Division No. 3 and  Division No. 2. It is located in the south central portion of the province.

History 
The RM of Willow Bunch No. 42 incorporated as a rural municipality on November 21, 1912.

Heritage properties
There is one historical building located within the RM.
Grand Valley Lutheran Church - Constructed in 1916, in Grand Valley

Geography

Communities and localities 
The following urban municipalities are surrounded by the RM.

Towns
 Willow Bunch

The following unincorporated communities are within the RM.

Organized hamlets
Scout Lake

Localities
Grand Valley
Gye
Lisieux
Little Woody
St. Victor, dissolved as a village February 26, 2003
Twin Valley

Jean Louis Legare Regional Park 
Established in 1961, the park was named after Jean-Louis Légaré, who was one of the original setters of Willow Bunch. The park has a campground, golf course, a picnic area, and hiking trails. The trails go through the coulees and valleys of the Big Muddy Valley. Access to the park is from Highway 36.

The campground has 45 campsites (41 of which have electric hookups), washrooms, showers, and a sani-dump. The Willow Bunch Golf Course is a par 36, 9-hole, grass greens course with 3,176 total yards. There is a licensed clubhouse with cart and club rentals.

Demographics 

Government 
The RM of Willow Bunch No. 42 is governed by an elected municipal council and an appointed administrator that meets on the second Monday of every month. The reeve of the RM is Denis Bellefleur while its administrator is Sharleine Eger. The RM's office is located in Willow Bunch.

Transportation 
The RM is a part owner of the Fife Lake Railway. The Willow Bunch Airport was an airport located within the municipality. The airport closed in 2009.

References 

Willow Bunch
 
Division No. 3, Saskatchewan